This is a list of sovereign states in the 1890s, giving an overview of states around the world during the period between 1 January 1890 and 31 December 1899. It contains entries, arranged alphabetically, with information on the status and recognition of their sovereignty. It includes widely recognized sovereign states, and entities which were de facto sovereign but which were not widely recognized by other states.

Sovereign states

States claiming sovereignty 
 Aceh – Sultanate of Aceh
 Biak-na-Bato – Philippine Republic (from November 1 to December 15, 1897)
 Counani  – Republic of Independent Guiana (to 1891)
 Formosa – Republic of Formosa (from May 24 to October 23, 1895)
 Franceville – Independent Commune of Franceville (to 1890)
 Lado – Lado District
Loreto - Federal State of Loreto (to July 10, 18960
 Mato Grosso – Transatlantic Republic of Mato Grosso (to 1892)
 Negros – Republic of Negros (from November 27, 1898)
 Swaziland – Kingdom of Swaziland (from 1894)
 Tagalog Republic – Sovereign Tagalog Nation (from August 29, 1896, to March 22, 1897)
 Trinidad – Principality of Trinidad (from 1893 to 1895)
 Zamboanga – Republic of Zamboanga (from May 18 to November 16, 1898)

Notes

References 

1890s-related lists